Mansour Al-Shammari (born 21 August 2000) in Saudi Arabia is a Saudi professional footballer who currently plays for Al-Ahli on loan from Al-Nassr as a defender.

Career
Al-Shammari began his career at the youth team of Al-Nassr. He signed his first professional contract with Al-Nassr on 2 February 2020. He was called up to the first team in the 2020 AFC Champions League. On 15 October 2020, Al-Shammari joined Al-Tai on loan from Al-Nassr. Al-Shammari made 34 appearances as Al-Tai earned promotion to the Pro League for the first time since 2008. Following the conclusion of his loan, Al-Shammari returned to his parent club Al-Nassr. He made his debut for Al-Nassr on 30 September 2021, in the 3–1 away win against Abha. On 2 January 2023, Al-Shammari joined Al-Ahli on a six-month loan.

References

External links

2000 births
Saudi Arabian footballers
Sportspeople from Riyadh
Living people
Saudi Arabia youth international footballers
Al Nassr FC players
Al-Tai FC players
Al-Ahli Saudi FC players
Saudi Professional League players
Saudi First Division League players
Association football fullbacks
Association football defenders